A full breakfast is a substantial cooked breakfast meal, often served in the United Kingdom and Ireland, that typically includes bacon, sausages, eggs, black pudding, baked beans,  tomatoes, mushrooms, toast, and a beverage such as coffee or tea. It appears in different regional variants and is referred to by different names depending on the area. While it is colloquially known as a "fry-up" in most areas of the United Kingdom and Ireland, it is usually referred to as a "full English" (often "full English breakfast"), a "full Irish", "full Scottish", "full Welsh", and "Ulster fry", in England, the Republic of Ireland, Scotland, Wales, and Northern Ireland, respectively.

History and popularity 
On its origin, Country Life magazine states, "The idea of the English breakfast as a national dish goes right back to the 13th century and the country houses of the gentry. In the old Anglo-Saxon tradition of hospitality, households would provide hearty breakfasts for visiting friends, relatives and neighbours". The fried breakfast became popular in Great Britain and Ireland during the Victorian era, and appears as one among many suggested breakfasts in home economist Isabella Beeton's Book of Household Management (1861). Its popularity soared post–World War II and became a staple of the working class. The protein-centric full breakfast is often contrasted (e.g. on hotel menus) with the lighter, carbohydrate-based alternative of a continental breakfast.

It is so popular in Great Britain and Ireland that many cafes and pubs offer the meal at any time of day as an "all-day breakfast". It is also popular in many Commonwealth nations. The full breakfast is among the most internationally recognised British dishes along with bangers and mash, shepherd's pie, fish and chips, roast beef, Sunday roast and the Christmas dinner.

United Kingdom and Ireland

The "traditional" full breakfast in the UK and Ireland includes back bacon (or more rarely, streaky bacon), sausage links (usually pork), eggs (fried, poached or scrambled), fried or grilled tomatoes, fried mushrooms and fried bread. Black pudding and baked beans are also frequently included. Buttered toast, and jam or marmalade are often served at the end of the meal although toast is generally available throughout the meal. In recent years, hash browns have become a popular inclusion. Breakfast cereal or porridge often precedes the breakfast dish.

As nearly everything is fried in this meal, it is commonly known as a "fry-up". In the UK it is sometimes referred to as a "Full Monty". One theory for the origin of this term is that British Army general Bernard Montgomery, nicknamed 'Monty', was said to have started every day with a "Full English" breakfast while on campaign in North Africa during the Second World War.

Regional variants

England 

A full breakfast in England can include bubble and squeak, but this is rare.

In the North Midlands, fried or grilled oatcakes sometimes replace fried bread.

Ireland

In Ireland, brown soda bread, fried potato farls, white pudding and boxty are often included.

The "breakfast roll", consisting of elements of the full breakfast served in a French roll, has become popular in Ireland due to the fact it can be easily eaten on the way to school or work. The breakfast roll is available from many petrol stations and corner shops throughout Ireland.

Ulster

In Ulster, the northern province in Ireland, the "Ulster fry" variant is popular throughout most of the province (chiefly in Northern Ireland and parts of County Donegal), where it is eaten not only at breakfast time but throughout the day. Typically it will include soda bread farls and potato bread.

Scotland

Distinctively Scottish elements of the full breakfast include Scottish style or Stornoway black pudding, Lorne sausage (sometimes called "square sausage" for its traditional shape), Ayrshire middle bacon and tattie scones. Occasionally haggis, white pudding, fruit pudding or oatcakes are included. 

Early editions of Brewer's Dictionary of Phrase and Fable referred to a Scotch breakfast as "a substantial breakfast of sundry sorts of good things to eat and drink".

Wales
Two key ingredients that distinguish the Welsh breakfast from the other "full" variations are cockles and laverbread (a seaweed purée often mixed with oatmeal and fried). Fried laver with cockles and bacon was the traditional breakfast for mine workers in the South Wales Coalfield, but a breakfast may have also included Welsh sausages, mushrooms and eggs.

North America

This style of breakfast was brought over by Irish and British immigrants to the United States and Canada, where it has endured.

Hong Kong

A few establishments in Hong Kong offer all-day breakfast or brunch options (hybrid of English and North American items) from formal restaurants to low-frills establishments.

See also

 List of breakfast topics

References

Reference bibliography

External links

 Stress-free full English breakfast
 Why the great British breakfast is a killer

Breakfast
British cuisine
Irish cuisine
Cuisine of Northern Ireland
Eggs (food)
Pork dishes
Food combinations
National dishes